Édson Andrade Almeida, also known as Édson Di (born 14 March 1979) is a Brazilian professional footballer who plays for Esporte Clube Flamengo.

Career
Édson Di played for Boavista Sport Club in the 2009 Campeonato Carioca, scoring a goal as the club defeated Madureira.

References

External links
Profile at Soccerway
 Brazilian FA Database

1979 births
Living people
Brazilian footballers
Brazilian expatriate footballers
Clube Atlético Juventus players
União São João Esporte Clube players
Santa Cruz Futebol Clube players
Associação Atlética Coruripe players
América Futebol Clube (RN) players
Boavista Sport Club players
Mixto Esporte Clube players
Treze Futebol Clube players
Duque de Caxias Futebol Clube players
F.C. Paços de Ferreira players
Primeira Liga players
Expatriate footballers in Portugal
Sportspeople from Bahia

Association football forwards